The front-end-of-line (FEOL) is the first portion of IC fabrication where the individual components (transistors, capacitors, resistors, etc.) are patterned in the semiconductor. 
FEOL generally covers everything up to (but not including) the deposition of metal interconnect layers.

For the CMOS process, FEOL contains all fabrication steps needed to form isolated CMOS elements:
 Selecting the type of wafer to be used; Chemical-mechanical planarization and cleaning of the wafer.
 Shallow trench isolation (STI) (or LOCOS in early processes, with feature size > 0.25 μm)
 Well formation
 Gate module formation
 Source and drain module formation

See also
Back end of line
Integrated circuit

References

Further reading
"CMOS: Circuit Design, Layout, and Simulation" Wiley-IEEE, 2010. . pages 177-178 (Chapter 7.2 CMOS Process Integration); pages 180-199 (7.2.1 Frontend-of-the-line integration)

Electronics manufacturing
Semiconductor device fabrication